Ron Guerrero (born March 3, 1974) is an American professional boxer who challenged for the WBA Fedecentro Heavyweight Title in 2004, and for the WBF World Heavyweight Title in 2009.  

He sparred with the Klitschko brothers. He was trained by Tony Ayala, Sr. for his fight against Francois Botha.

Professional record

|- style="margin:0.5em auto; font-size:95%;"
|align="center" colspan=8|23 Wins (14 knockouts), 21 Losses (6 knockouts), 3 Draws
|- style="margin:0.5em auto; font-size:95%;"
|align=center style="border-style: none none solid solid; background: #e3e3e3"|Res.
|align=center style="border-style: none none solid solid; background: #e3e3e3"|Record
|align=center style="border-style: none none solid solid; background: #e3e3e3"|Opponent
|align=center style="border-style: none none solid solid; background: #e3e3e3"|Type
|align=center style="border-style: none none solid solid; background: #e3e3e3"|Rd., Time
|align=center style="border-style: none none solid solid; background: #e3e3e3"|Date
|align=center style="border-style: none none solid solid; background: #e3e3e3"|Location
|align=center style="border-style: none none solid solid; background: #e3e3e3"|Notes
|-align=center
|Win|| 22-20-3 ||align=left| Maurenzo Smith
|UD || 6 || 2020-03-07 || align=left| Constellation Field, Sugar Land, Texas, U.S.
|align=left|Won vacant American Boxing Federation American West Heavyweight Title
|-align=center
|Loss|| 20-16-3 ||align=left| Francois Botha
|UD || 12 || 2009-02-06 || align=left| Tlokwe Banquet Hall, Potchefstroom, South Africa
|align=left|For vacant WBF World Heavyweight Title in 2009
|-align=center
|Win|| 20-15-3 ||align=left| Roderick Willis
|TKO || || 2008-05-24 || align=left| Richard M. Borchard Regional Fairgrounds, Robstown, Texas, U.S.
|align=left|
|-align=center
|Loss|| 19-15-3 ||align=left| Chazz Witherspoon
|RTD || 5 (8) || 2007-09-29 || align=left| Boardwalk Hall, Atlantic City, U.S.
|align=left|
|-align=center
|Loss|| 19-14-3 ||align=left| Kevin Johnson
|UD || 8 || 2007-06-09 || align=left| Connecticut Convention Center, Hartford, U.S.
|align=left|
|-align=center
|Win|| 19-13-3 ||align=left| Hector Ferreyro
|KO ||  || 2007-04-20 || align=left| Casa Blanca Ballroom, Laredo, Texas, U.S.
|align=left|
|-align=center
|Win|| 18-12-3 ||align=left| Robbie McClimans 
|SD || 8 || 2006-09-15 || align=left| Dodge Arena, Hidalgo, Texas, U.S.
|align=left|
|-align=center
|Loss|| 16-11-3 ||align=left| David Defiagbon
|TKO || 5 || 2004-06-12 || align=left| Cedarbridge Academy, Devonshire Parish, Bermuda
|align=left|For WBA Fedecentro Heavyweight Title
|-align=center
|Loss || 16-10-3 ||align=left| Kendrick Releford
|UD || 8 || 2004-04-29 || align=left| Laredo, Texas, U.S.
|align=left|For vacant USA Texas State Heavyweight Title
|-align=center
|Win || 16-6-3 ||align=left| Josué Blocus
|RTD || 5 || 2003-02-15 || align=left| Caesars Palace, Las Vegas, Nevada, U.S.
|align=left|
|-align=center
|Loss || 15-6-2 ||align=left| Tony Thompson
|UD || 5 || 2002-08-31 || align=left| Strawberry Field, Bridgehampton, New York, U.S.
|align=left|
|-align=center
|Loss || 15-4-2 ||align=left| Attila Levin
|UD || 10 || 2002-03-29 || align=left| Paris Las Vegas, Las Vegas, Nevada, U.S.
|align=left|
|-align=center
|Win || 15-3-1 ||align=left| Terrence Lewis
|UD || 10 || 2002-03-29 || align=left| Flamingo Hilton, Laughlin, Nevada, U.S.
|align=left|
|-align=center
|Win || 11-3-1 ||align=left| Adam Flores
|UD || 6 || 2000-10-06 || align=left| Hard Rock Hotel and Casino, Las Vegas, Nevada, U.S.
|align=left|
|-align=center
|Win || 10-3-1 ||align=left| Brian Nix
|PTS || 8 || 2000-07-27 || align=left| Hammerstein Ballroom, Manhattan, New York, U.S.
|align=left|
|-align=center
|Draw || 8-2-1 ||align=left| Jameel McCline
|PTS || 8 || 2000-01-27 || align=left| Hammerstein Ballroom, Manhattan, New York, U.S.
|align=left|
|-align=center
|Win || 6-1 ||align=left| Bobby Scoggins
|SD || 6 || 1999-09-23 || align=left| Convention Center, Fort Worth, Texas, U.S.
|align=left|
|-align=center
|Win || 5-1 ||align=left| Jason Waller
|TKO ||  || 1999-08-12 || align=left| Civic Center Arena, Laredo, Texas, U.S.
|align=left|
|-align=center

References

Living people
1974 births
American male boxers
Heavyweight boxers
Boxers from Texas